Adrian Dumitru Mihalcea (born 24 May 1976 in Slobozia) is a Romanian professional football manager and former player, currently in charge of Liga II club Gloria Buzău.

Career
Mihalcea spent many years playing with one of the top Romanian teams, Dinamo București, where he won the Romanian First Division championship in 2000 and the Romanian Cup in 2000 and again in 2001.

Mihalcea started the 2001 season for Dinamo in excellent form, scoring 11 goals in 14 league matches, and earned 5th place in the competition for the 2001 Romanian Footballer of the Year award. This performance attracted the interest of Italian Serie B side Genoa 1893, and Mihalcea signed for the club in January 2002. The following season Mihalcea scored nine goals in Serie B and was Genoa's leading goalscorer for the campaign. In summer 2003, he was sold to fellow Serie B club Hellas Verona and enjoyed another good season scoring five goals in 20 league matches for his new club.

After the experience in Italy, a return to Dinamo Bucharest in 2004 was disappointing, with Mihalcea struggling for goals as the team narrowly missed out on the Romanian championship. They saved the season and managed, with Mihalcea one of the team's captains, to win the Romanian Cup. He scored only one goal that season, against Sportul Studențesc.

Mihalcea was sold again at the end of that season, in the summer of 2005, this time to South-Korean club Chunnam Dragons, but he only played five games without scoring there and because he could not adapt to the Asian style of life and football he came back home. He was free of contract for about two months and trained alone in Bucharest, at his ex-team Dinamo's stadium. At the beginning of March 2006 he signed a three-month contract with Romanian side FC Vaslui. At this point he was no longer in the attention of the Romania national football team.

In the summer of 2006, Mihalcea moved to Cypriot side Aris Limassol in an attempt to resurrect his career. He started by scoring 16 goals in 24 matches, more than he had scored in the previous five years. He continued his consistent good form by scoring 12 goals in 25 matches in the next season. Following the relegation of Aris in the Cypriot second division, AEL Limassol showed interest in the striker and transferred him in the summer of 2008. After Aris returned to Cypriot first division, Mihalcea came back, and scored eight goals in 28 matches in the 2009–2010 season, also being named captain of the team. He was very respected at Aris for being one of its best scorers.

In the summer of 2010 he signed with Liga I team Astra Ploiești, coming there as a free agent because his contract in Cyprus had ended. In the winter of 2010 he moved to the league winning side Unirea Urziceni.

He ended his career at Unirea Slobozia, in Liga II. He helped the team maintain its place in the second division in 2012–13 season, and in June 2013 he announced his retirement, citing his desire to start his coaching career.

International career 

Mihalcea's international career with Romania has not lived up to his early promise, as he played ten times for the Romanian under-21 team, scoring three goals, and was tipped to be a star of the future by Ilie Dumitrescu. He was promoted to the Romania international squad in 1998 but failed to score in 16 appearances. He was overlooked for the European Championships in 2000 and last capped by Romania in 2003.

International stats

Manager career 

Mihalcea started his manager career in 2013, at Unirea Slobozia, in his hometown. In 2017, he became assistant manager at the Romania national team, working alongside Cosmin Contra.

He was named head coach at Dinamo București in March 2020. After only seven games in charge, he was sacked. Dinamo won only one of the seven games and fell into the relegation zone in Liga I.

On 7 June 2022, Mihalcea was appointed head coach at Chindia Târgoviște on a one-year deal, with an option to extend for a further year . On 20 September, after three months in charge, he was sacked.

Honours

Club
Dinamo Bucharest
Divizia A: 1999–2000
Romania Cup: 1999–00, 2000–01, 2004–05

References

External links
 
 
 
 Adrian Mihalcea at Playerhistory.com
 

1976 births
Living people
People from Slobozia
Romanian footballers
Association football forwards
Romania under-21 international footballers
Romania international footballers
Romanian expatriate footballers
FC Dunărea Călărași players
FC Dinamo București players
Genoa C.F.C. players
Hellas Verona F.C. players
Jeonnam Dragons players
FC Vaslui players
Aris Limassol FC players
AEL Limassol players
FC Astra Giurgiu players
FC Unirea Urziceni players
CS Concordia Chiajna players
AFC Unirea Slobozia players
Liga I players
K League 1 players
Serie B players
Cypriot First Division players
Romanian football managers
AFC Unirea Slobozia managers
FC Dunărea Călărași managers
FC UTA Arad managers
CS Mioveni managers
FC Dinamo București managers
AFC Chindia Târgoviște managers
FC Gloria Buzău managers
Liga I managers
Liga II managers
Romanian expatriate sportspeople in Italy
Romanian expatriate sportspeople in South Korea
Expatriate footballers in Italy
Expatriate footballers in South Korea
Expatriate footballers in Cyprus
Romanian expatriate sportspeople in Cyprus